Turku University of Applied Sciences (abbr. TUAS, Finnish Turun ammattikorkeakoulu) is a multidisciplinary higher education institution, located in the city of Turku and Salo in the Southwest Finland. The institute began operations as a temporary polytechnic in autumn 1992. Before 2006-01-10, the institution carried the English name of Turku Polytechnic.

At the moment, the establishment has approximately 9,600 students and 700 members of staff, making it one of the largest universities of applied sciences in Finland.

In Finland Universities of Applied Sciences (UAS) have the mission to train professionals with emphasis on labour market needs and conduct research and development which supports instruction and promotes regional development in particular. The education in UAS emphasises co-operation with the business, industry and service sectors at the regional level in particular.

TUAS offers education in four fields of study and altogether in over 70 degree programmes, both Bachelor and Master studies. Most of the degree programmes are conducted only in Finnish. TUAS provides also training and consulting services for both individuals and organizations in the public and private sector and coordinates or acts as a partner in over 200 RDI projects yearly.

Campuses 
Turku University of Applied Sciences has campuses in the following towns:
 Turku
 Salo

Fields of education  
Turku University of Applied Sciences offers education in the following faculties:
Arts Academy: a prominent regional operator in the field of culture, producing performances, exhibitions and other events. Approximately 800 students.
 Faculty of Health and Well-being: a centre of technological and business competence, educating engineers and Bachelors of Business Administration. Approximately 3,000 students.
 Faculty of Engineering and Business: educates professionals to work in the field of health care and social services. Approximately 5,800 students.

Degree programmes conducted in English

Bachelor's degrees 

 Bachelor of Business Administration, International Business Online 
 Bachelor of Engineering, Information and Communications Technology

Master's degrees 
 Master of Business Administration, Business Management 
 Master of Business Administration, Sales Management 	 
 Master of Business Administration, Service Design 	 
 Master of Culture and Arts, Creative Design Management, online

References

External links
 TUAS Official Site
 TUAS International Students at Facebook

Education in Turku